Cyril Valéry Isaac Hanouna (born 23 September 1974) is a French radio and television presenter, writer, author, columnist, producer, singer and occasional actor and comedian of Tunisian origins. He is best known for hosting the popular French TV show Touche pas à mon poste.

Early life
Hanouna was born into a Jewish family, he is the son of a general practitioner and a saleswoman who arrived in France from Tunis in 1969. He first studied to become a doctor like his father. After having difficulties in high school, he decided to study management to become a chartered accountant, but he later gave up his studies.

Career

Highlights
Hanouna made his television debut in 1999 on the television channel Comédie+ where he wrote the lyrics for the trailers. Hanouna became a television presenter in 2002 when he co-hosted the third series of La Grosse Émission alongside comedian duo Kad et Olivier. In February 2002 he was approached by RTL Radio and he hosted a radio show called Planet Arthur alongside Manu Levy and Valérie Bénaïm. In 2003 he hosted the morning show Morning Live on M6.

Since 2008 Hanouna has been associated with the Eurovision Song Contest. At the 2008 Contest, he presented the French tele-votes, and then provided the French commentary for the 2009 and 2010 Contests alongside Julien Courbet and Stéphane Bern.

Currently, he is a host on Europe 1, and on television with Touche Pas à Mon Poste (up to 2012 on France 4), before moving with the whole TV show team to D8 since the new channel was launched on 7 October. The channel also bought the rights for Nouvelle Star, the French version of the Pop Idol Series, and Hanouna became the host of the show.

In 2011, he acted in the third installment of La Vérité si je mens !.

Nowadays he is the producer of his own entertainment company, H2O Production, where he works on some of the most popular TV shows of C8 (as D8 was renamed). He is also active on almost all channels which are owned by Vincent Bolloré (Direct 8, Direct Star and Canal+). In 2015 Bolloré spent 250 million Euros to keep Hanouna on his team.

In 2019, he proposed a television show which he would co-host with a French politician to address the concerns of French citizens, a reaction to the yellow vests movement.

Controversies
Cyril Hanouna has often received satirical awards from Gérards de la Télévision: Industrial Mistake Award 2007, Worst Presenter 2013 and 2014, The Presenter Who Doesn't Need Drugs 2016. In February 2016, he was drawn by Charlie Hebdo as a mosquito sucking out children's brains.

He is described as an annoying clown, switching from hysterical chuckles to vulgarities, and is involved in several affairs such as offering non-existent gifts, ripping a book during a broadcast, humiliating journalists and collaborators and making sexist and homophobic jokes.
In February 2016 two French journalists (Julien Cazarre and Arnaud Ramsay) reported that they received threats from Hanouna when they refused to appear on his show. Society magazine compiled a long report about him, describing him as "tyrannical, pretentious, full of anger," managing his team with "scabrous practices", based on evidence coming from his own collaborators (who were anonymously quoted). Stéphane Guillon, another Canal+ presenter, describes Hanouna as the "Kim Jong-Il of C8".

In November and December 2016, the Superior Council of Audiovisual launched two administrative procedures against Touche Pas a Mon Poste because of frequent humiliations and sexist and homophobic statements during the broadcast. In one segment of the show, Hanouna posted a fake gay dating profile online using a torso picture of gay model Max Emerson and mocked the men who responded to the profile while he was live on air. The segment triggered nearly 20,000 complaints to regulators and condemnation from LGBT groups.

In December 2016, the French association of LGBT journalists counted 42 sexist and homophobic jokes, and describes him as an unapologetic promoter of homophobia.

Discography

Singles

Filmography
 2012 : La vérité si je mens 3
 2015 : The New Adventures of Aladdin
 2016 : Pattaya
 2016 : La vache
 2022 : La France dans ce qu'il y a de pire
 2022 : Je suis un taré

Radio
 2006–2011: La Bonne Touche with Jean-Pierre Foucault on RTL
 2011–2013: Hanouna, le matin on Virgin Radio
 2013–2016: Les pieds dans le plat on Europe 1

References

External links

  Biography at Pure People
 

1974 births
Living people
Writers from Paris
French television presenters
French television writers
French radio presenters
21st-century French comedians
French male television actors
French male film actors
French people of Tunisian-Jewish descent
21st-century French Jews
French male screenwriters
Male television writers
French male comedians
Far-right politics in France